Rak-Su are an English R&B group, formed in Watford. In 2017, they won the fourteenth series of The X Factor, becoming the first male group to do so. The group is made up of Ashley Fongho, Jamaal Shurland, Myles Stephenson, and previously Mustafa Rahimtulla, before departing from the group in November 2020. They finished 2022 with a headline slot at the world famous Seal Bay Resort in Selsey, United Kingdom.

"Dimelo", which features Naughty Boy and Wyclef Jean, was released as their winner's single, and marked the first time a winner's single was written by the winner. It entered the UK Singles Chart at number two, behind Ed Sheeran's "Perfect". Their self-titled debut extended play, Rak-Su, was released on 16 February 2018.

Stephenson appeared on the 19th series of I'm a Celebrity...Get Me Out of Here! in 2019, where he came 7th.

Career

2016–2017: Formation and The X Factor
Rak-Su are a four-piece group consisting of childhood friends Ashley Fongho, Jamaal Shurland, Myles Stephenson and Mustafa Rahimtulla, from Watford. Fongho and Stephenson had been best friends since the age of 11, recording their freestyles together in their houses. Shurland emigrated from Barbados to Watford at the age of 12 and attended the same school with Stephenson and Rahimtulla. Shurland and Rahimtulla began performing together at the age of 14, and Fongho met and began performing with Rahimtulla at age 16. In their early twenties, Fongho met Shurland at a party after hearing him sing, and the two began recording and performing together, with Stephenson and Rahimtulla attending their recording sessions and live performances. By 2016, the four had decided to form their own music group and soon decided to audition for The X Factor in hopes of gaining exposure for their original material.

In 2017, Rak-Su auditioned for The X Factor in front of judges Simon Cowell, Louis Walsh, Sharon Osbourne and Nicole Scherzinger. Following producers' earlier advice against singing their original material, they began performing "Señorita" by Justin Timberlake until they were stopped by Cowell, who was unimpressed and requested a different song. They then performed an original song called "I'm Feeling You", and received four "Yes" votes from the judges, who praised the group for their originality, and Cowell noted that they would not have passed their audition on their first song alone.

After the first bootcamp challenge, the group continued to perform their original material, reaching the six-chair challenge in the "Groups" category, mentored by Cowell. They passed the six-chair challenge with their original song "Change Your Mind" and after they performed their song "Palm Tree" at the judges houses' round in front of Cowell, and his assistant and former X Factor judge Cheryl, Cowell proceeded to put them through to the live shows.

During the live shows, they continued to perform mainly original material, with two cover versions with additional raps by Fongho and Stephenson. They were runners-up of the Prize Fight in week 1 against Grace Davies and week 2 against Kevin Davy White, and were eventually voted as winners of the Prize Fight in week 4 against Davies, leading to a songwriting session with American songwriter Ali Tamposi as the reward. With the eliminations of Jack & Joel in week 3, Sean and Conor Price in the quarter-final and The Cutkelvins in the semi-final, Rak-Su became Cowell's remaining act in the competition. They made it to the final on the weekend of 2 December 2017, alongside Davy White and Davies. After Davy White was eliminated on Saturday's show, they were in the top two with Davies and finished as the winners with over 50% of the public vote. 

Rak-Su are the second group to win the show after Little Mix in 2011, and the first and only male group to win the show. On 3 December 2017, their winners single was added to streaming services as well as being available for download immediately after the final, with profits going towards the charities Together for Short Lives and Shooting Star Chase. It placed at number 6 on the Official Singles Chart Update two days after the final. Four of their songs topped the iTunes chart during their run on the X Factor — "Mamacita", "Dimelo", "Mona Lisa" and "I'm Feeling You" - but were ineligible for the Official Chart and were not available on streaming services at that time. After the voting stats were revealed Rak-Su were the clear winners. They won every week except for week 3 on Saturday where they came 2nd when Kevin Davy White overtook them by a tight edge of 1% percent of the votes.

2018–present: Rak-Su EP, Rome EP, Lost Tour EP and Finally Free
On 16 February 2018, they released a self-tilted EP including the songs - "Mamacita", "Dimelo", "Mona Lisa" and "I'm Feeling You". On 30 March 2018 they performed live on The X Factor Denmark with their single "Dimelo". On 23 May 2018, it was announced that Rak-Su will support Little Mix on their Summer Hits Tour 2018. On 29 June 2018, they released "Pyro Ting" with Banx & Ranx. On 28 September 2018, Rak-Su released their new single "I Want You To Freak", with the official video released on 5 October 2018. On 6 October 2018, it was announced that Rak-Su will support Olly Murs on his You Know, I Know Tour in 2019. On 21 October 2018, Rak-Su returned to The X Factor to perform their new single "I Want You To Freak" on the first results show.

On 10 November 2018 it was announced that both Rak-Su and Little Mix parted ways with Syco Music, with the label stating that they would no longer work with Modest! Management, who manages both acts, and facilitating a transfer to RCA Records. On 22 February 2019, they released their second EP, Rome. On 5 April 2019, Rak-Su released their new single "Yours or Mine". On 5 July 2019, they released their single "Rotate (Clockwise)". On 29 August 2019, it was reported that Rak-Su had been dropped from RCA due to lack of mainstream chart success.

On 8 November 2019, Rak-Su released their first single as independent artists, "La Bomba". On 6 December 2019, Rak-Su released the song "Girl". On 28 May 2020, Rak-Su released their X Factor Judges Houses song "Palm Trees" as a single. On 3 July 2020, Rak-Su released the song "Who Am I? (Black Lives Matter)" in response to the Black Lives Matter movement. On 6 November 2020, Rak-Su released the song "Girls Like You", featuring Celina Sharma. On 20 November 2020, Fongho, Shurland and Stephenson announced that Rahimtulla would be taking a hiatus from the group as a result of his mental health struggles. On 11 December 2020, Rak-Su released their first single as a temporary trio, "No Contest". On 3 January 2021, Fongho announced that he had tested positive for COVID-19.

On 22 January 2021, Rak-Su released the song "Left Right" featuring Donel. On 23 April 2021, Rak-Su released their third EP titled Lost Tour. Throughout 2021, Rak-Su appeared as featured artists on Romano's song "Tongue Tied" and Laidback Luke's song "Over & Over". On 12 August 2021, Rak-Su released the song "Statement" with Lenny Loso. On 10 September 2021, Rak-Su released their debut mixtape called Finally Free.

On 28 February 2022, Rak-Su announced that will released the song "Temporary Love" with Tom Ferry and TWNTY24. The song was released on 4 March 2022. The song won’t have vocals from Myles Stephenson on it because he had a sore throat at the time.

On 25 March 2022, Rak-Su provided vocals for the song "Just a Friend" with British DJ AJ Moreno.

On 6 August 2022, Rak-Su did a gig at Parkdean Camber Sands. However, it was unclear whether they would finish their gig as there was high possibility of police attending; clearing the venue; and arresting suspects of the prior night's serious incident, which resulted in a death.

On 25 November 2022, Rak-Su released their new single, "Neymar".

Members
 Ashley Fongho (2016–present)
 Jamaal Shurland (2016–present)
 Myles Stephenson (2016–present)
 Mustafa Rahimtulla (2016–2020)

Discography

Extended plays

Mixtapes

Singles

Guest appearances

Concert tours

Headlining 
Rak-Su - The Scenic Route Tour (2019)
Rak-Su - (2021)

Supporting 
 The X Factor Live Tour (2018)
 Little Mix - Summer Hits Tour 2018 (2018)
 Olly Murs - You Know I Know Tour (2019)

References

English boy bands
English pop music groups
English vocal groups
British contemporary R&B musical groups
Musical groups established in 2017
Musicians from Watford
Sony BMG artists
Syco Music artists
The X Factor (British TV series) winners
Vocal quartets
Musical groups from Hertfordshire
2017 establishments in England